Wrestling has been part of the Pan American Games since the 1951 Games in Buenos Aires, Argentina.

Medal table
Updated until 2019 edition.

See also
 Pan American Wrestling Championships

External links 
 Wrestling at the Pan American Games
 Sports123.com: Wrestling at the Pan American Games

 
Sports at the Pan American Games
Pan American Games
Wrestling in North America
Wrestling in South America